The XXI Army Corps / XXI AK was a corps level command of the German Army, before and during World War I.

As the German Army expanded in the latter part of the 19th century and early part of the 20th century, the XXI Army Corps was set up on 1 October 1912 in Saarbrücken as the Generalkommando (headquarters) for the districts of Koblenz, Trier and part of Alsace-Lorraine.  It took over command of 31st Division from XV Corps and the newly formed 42nd Division (the last division to be formed by the peacetime army).  General der Infanterie Fritz von Below, former commander of 1st Guards Division, took command.

It was assigned to the VII Army Inspectorate. but joined the predominantly Bavarian 6th Army at the start of the First World War.  It was still in existence at the end of the war in the 5th Army, Heeresgruppe Gallwitz on the Western Front.

Peacetime organisation 
The 25 peacetime Corps of the German Army (Guards, I - XXI, I - III Bavarian) had a reasonably standardised organisation.  Each consisted of two divisions with usually two infantry brigades, one field artillery brigade and a cavalry brigade each.  Each brigade normally consisted of two regiments of the appropriate type, so each Corps normally commanded 8 infantry, 4 field artillery and 4 cavalry regiments.  There were exceptions to this rule:
V, VI, VII, IX and XIV Corps each had a 5th infantry brigade (so 10 infantry regiments)
II, XIII, XVIII and XXI had a 9th infantry regiment
I, VI and XVI Corps had a 3rd cavalry brigade (so 6 cavalry regiments)
the Guards Corps had 11 infantry regiments (in 5 brigades) and 8 cavalry regiments (in 4 brigades).
Each Corps also directly controlled a number of other units.  This could include one or more 
Foot Artillery Regiment
Jäger Battalion
Pioneer Battalion
Train Battalion

World War I

Organisation on mobilisation 
On mobilization on 2 August 1914 the Corps was restructured.  42nd Cavalry Brigade was withdrawn to form part of the 7th Cavalry Division and the 31st Cavalry Brigade was broken up and its regiments assigned to the divisions as reconnaissance units.  Divisions received engineer companies and other support units from the Corps headquarters.  Unusually, the Corps retained its 9th infantry regiment on mobilisation.  In summary, XXI Corps mobilised with 27 infantry battalions, 9 machine gun companies (54 machine guns), 8 cavalry squadrons, 24 field artillery batteries (144 guns), 4 heavy artillery batteries (16 guns), 3 pioneer companies, and an aviation detachment.

Combat chronicle 
On mobilisation, XXI Corps was assigned to the predominantly Bavarian 6th Army forming part of the left wing of the forces for the Schlieffen Plan offensive in August 1914 on the Western Front. By 1915 it was on the Eastern Front where it took part in the siege of Kovno and the battles on the Neman River and at Vilnius. It was still in existence at the end of the war in the 5th Army, Heeresgruppe Gallwitz on the Western Front.

Commanders 
The XXI Corps had the following commanders during its existence:

See also 

German Army order of battle (1914)
German Army order of battle, Western Front (1918)
List of Imperial German infantry regiments
List of Imperial German artillery regiments
List of Imperial German cavalry regiments

References

Bibliography 
 
 
 
 
 

Corps of Germany in World War I
Military units and formations established in 1912
Military units and formations disestablished in 1919